The 2018 Marist Red Foxes football team represented Marist College in the 2018 NCAA Division I FCS football season. They were led by 27th-year head coach Jim Parady and played their home games at Tenney Stadium at Leonidoff Field. They were members of the Pioneer Football League. They finished the season 5–6, 5–3 in PFL play to finish in a tie for fourth place.

Previous season
The Red Foxes finished the 2017 season 4–7, 3–5 in PFL play to finish in a tie for eighth place.

Preseason

Preseason All-PFL team
The PFL released their preseason all-PFL team on July 30, 2018, with the Red Foxes having four players selected.

Offense

Juston Christian – WR

Defense

Eddie Zinn-Turner – DL

Willie Barrett – LB

Wes Beans – DB

Preseason coaches poll
The PFL released their preseason coaches poll on July 31, 2018, with the Red Foxes predicted to finish in seventh place.

Award watch lists

Schedule

Source: Schedule

Game summaries

Georgetown

at Bryant

at Stetson

Dayton

at Columbia

at Jacksonville

Davidson

at Morehead State

Valparaiso

at Drake

San Diego

References

Marist
Marist Red Foxes football seasons
Marist Red Foxes football